Sybra quadriguttata is a species of beetle in the family Cerambycidae. It was described by Per Olof Christopher Aurivillius in 1927. It is known from the Philippines.

References

quadriguttata
Beetles described in 1927